D. Scott Stamper is a former American football running back. He played for the San Antonio Gunslingers in the United States Football League. He played college football at Fort Lewis College and was inducted into the college's hall of fame in 1996.

References

External links
 Totalfootballstats.com
 Gamewornfootballjersey.com

Year of birth missing (living people)
Living people
American football running backs
Fort Lewis Skyhawks football players
San Antonio Gunslingers players
Place of birth missing (living people)